Edward Wray Taylor (born February 25, 1942) is a Canadian former professional ice hockey player who played 166 games in the National Hockey League and 421 games in the World Hockey Association. He played with the Detroit Red Wings, New York Rangers, Minnesota North Stars, Vancouver Canucks, and Houston Aeros. Taylor made his professional debut in 1962, spending his first several years in the minor leagues before making his NHL debut in 1965. He would split the next few years between the NHL and minor leagues before playing two full seasons with the Canucks from 1970 to 1972. He then moved to Houston of the upstart World Hockey Association, and played the last six years of his career there, helping the Aeros win the championship Avco World Trophy in both 1974 and 1975, before retiring in 1978.

Career statistics

Regular season and playoffs

Awards and achievements
 Turnbull Cup MJHL Championship (1960, 1962)
 Avco Cup (WHA) Championships (1974, 1975)
 Member of the Manitoba Hockey Hall of Fame

External links

1942 births
Living people
Baltimore Clippers players
Canadian ice hockey left wingers
Detroit Red Wings players
Houston Aeros (WHA) players
Ice hockey people from Manitoba
Brandon Wheat Kings players
Minnesota North Stars players
New York Rangers players
People from Westman Region, Manitoba
Pittsburgh Hornets players
Rochester Americans players
St. Paul Rangers players
Sudbury Wolves (EPHL) players
Vancouver Canucks players
Vancouver Canucks (WHL) players